Ralph Bunche may refer to:

Ralph Bunche (1904–1971), American political scientist, academic and diplomat, recipient of 1950 Nobel Peace Prize 
Ralph J. Bunche III (born 1979), American lawyer and politician, General Secretary of UNPO

Places
Ralph Bunche Park, Turtle Bay, New York City, NY, USA
Ralph Bunche House (disambiguation), a number of houses:
Ralph Johnson Bunche House, Queens, New York
Ralph Bunche House (Washington, D.C.)
Ralph J. Bunche House, Los Angeles, California
Ralph Bunche High School, King George, Virginia
Ralph J. Bunche Library, Washington, D.C. 
Ralph J. Bunche International Affairs Center, at Howard University, Washington, D.C.

See also
Bunche